Martha Macintyre  (born 1945) is an Australian anthropologist and historian whose work has focused on studying social change in Papua New Guinea and Melanesia. As of 2021, she is an honorary professor at the University of Melbourne.

Born in Melbourne in 1945, Macintyre was educated at Maribyrnong High School before moving to Mac Robertson Girls' High School to complete her secondary education. She then studied history at the University of Melbourne and graduated with a BA in 1970. After that she moved to England with her husband, Stuart, where she worked for the Master of King's College, Edmund Leach, cataloguing his library and studying for a MPhil in anthropology at the University of Cambridge.

Returning to Australia she was accepted to undertake a PhD at the Australian National University, which included field trips to Papua New Guinea. She combined her historical research skills with anthropological observations of matrilineal kinship.

Macintyre was elected a Fellow of the Australian Anthropological Society in 1989 and, following two terms as president was subsequently give honorary life membership. She also served as editor of The Australian Journal of Anthropology.

She was elected a Fellow of the Academy of the Social Sciences in Australia in 2012.

Selected publications

References 

1945 births
Living people
University of Melbourne alumni
Alumni of the University of Cambridge
Australian National University alumni
Academic staff of La Trobe University
Academic staff of the University of Melbourne
Australian anthropologists
Scientists from Melbourne
People educated at Mac.Robertson Girls' High School